Phaq'u Q'awa is a  mountain in the Andes. According to the Bolivian IGM map 1:50,000 'Nevados Payachata  Hoja 5739-I' it is situated on Bolivian terrain in the La Paz Department, Pacajes Province, Charaña Municipality, at the border with Chile. Phaq'u Q'awa lies north-west of the mountain Kunturiri and south-east of the mountain Laram Q'awa. The nearest peak to the east is Jaruma (Aymara for "bitter water"). One of three different rivers of this area called Kunturiri (Condoriri) originates north of the mountain. It flows in a bow along the northern slopes of Laram Q'awa towards Chile.

Name
The Hispanicized spelling is Pacocahua or Pajojañua.

See also
 Jach'a Kunturiri
 Sajama National Park

References

Mountains of La Paz Department (Bolivia)